is a retired Japanese athlete who specialised in sprinting events. He represented his country at the 1995 World Championships in Athletics. He won a gold medal at the 1994 Asian Games in the 4 × 100 m relay, while his best individual success was winning bronze at the 1995 Asian Athletics Championships in the 100 m.

Competition record

Personal bests
Outdoor
100 metres – 10.22 (+0.6 m/s, Tokyo 1995)
200 metres – 20.70 (+1.7 m/s, Hiroshima 1994)

Indoor
60 metres – 6.69 (Barcelona 1995)

References

External links
 
 Yoshitaka Ito at All-Athletics.com

1970 births
Living people
Japanese male sprinters
Athletes (track and field) at the 1994 Asian Games
World Athletics Championships athletes for Japan
Asian Games medalists in athletics (track and field)
Asian Games gold medalists for Japan
Medalists at the 1994 Asian Games